The 2016–17 NC State Wolfpack men's basketball team represented North Carolina State University during the 2016–17 NCAA Division I men's basketball season. The Wolfpack, led by sixth-year head coach Mark Gottfried, played its home games at PNC Arena in Raleigh, North Carolina and were members of the Atlantic Coast Conference (ACC). They finished the season 15–17, 4-14 in ACC play to finish in a tie for 13th place. They lost in the first round of the ACC tournament to Clemson.

On February 16, 2017, head coach Mark Gottfried was fired, but the school allowed him to finish out the season. He finished at NC State with a six-year record of 123–86. On March 17, the school hired UNC Wilmington head coach Kevin Keatts as head coach.

Previous season
The Wolfpack finished the 2015–16 season 16–17, 5–13 in ACC play to finish in 13th place. They defeated Wake Forest in the first round of the ACC tournament before losing in the second round to Duke.

Departures

Class of 2016 signees

Roster

}

Schedule and results

|-
!colspan=12 style=| Exhibition

|-
!colspan=12 style=| Non-conference regular season
  
   

|-
!colspan=12 style=| ACC regular season

|-
!colspan=12 style=| ACC Tournament

References

NC State Wolfpack men's basketball seasons
NC State
2016 in sports in North Carolina
2017 in sports in North Carolina